Michael Late Benedum (July 16, 1869 – July 30, 1959) was a wealthy businessman from Pittsburgh, Pennsylvania, who made his fortune in the oil and natural gas industry in the early 20th century.

Benedum was born in Bridgeport, West Virginia. His mother, Caroline Southworth Benedum, named him after the family doctor Michael Late. Michael attended school until age 16, when he quit to take his first job at the Davison Flour Mill where he worked 12 hours a day and was paid $16 a month.

His only son, Claude Worthington Benedum, was born in 1898 in Cameron, West Virginia, but died at the age of 20 during the 1918 Spanish flu pandemic while working with the United States Army on chemical warfare.

Career
Benedum's career got a lucky start after a chance encounter on a train with a superintendent of the South Penn Oil Company. Benedum was known for his negotiating skills and his success as a wildcatter. He is said to have found "more oil in more places than anyone in history." With his long-term business partner Joe Trees, Benedum created the Benedum-Trees Oil Company. The famous partnership started with the purchase of an oil lease in Pleasants County, West Virginia. The first well on this lease began producing in 1896; soon, six other wells became active. The profit from this lease allowed Benedum and Trees to purchase a dozen additional leases in West Virginia.

The company was responsible for the discovery of the famous Yates Oil Field in Texas. The business was so successful that Benedum appeared on a list of the 76 wealthiest Americans in 1957. He was proclaimed West Virginian of the Year in the same year for leaving much of his wealth to the improvement of the state.

Benedum was a Democrat and donated heavily to the party. The New York Times described him as a "friend" of President Roosevelt. Benedum made a particular effort to convince African Americans, who at that time largely identified with the Republican party, to vote Democratic.

Legacy and philanthropy

Benedum never retired. Though he was very wealthy and 87 years old, The New York Times reported in 1956 that he continued to work seven days a week. In 1910, Benedum sold an oil lease which he had procured in Caddo Parish, Louisiana, for $7 million.

Benedum donated to many charitable causes during his lifetime. He was responsible for the construction of a civic center and a Methodist church building in his hometown of Bridgeport, West Virginia. The wealth from the Benedum estate was placed in a foundation named for the Benedums' son: the Claude Worthington Benedum Foundation. Benedum directed that the foundation use the money for causes local to Pittsburgh and West Virginia.

In 1950, the Texas Railroad Commission named an oilfield after Michael Benedum. The Benedum Field is located in northeast Upton County, Texas. This honor was given Benedum after his lease produced the discovery well, Alford No. 1, in 1948. This well kicked off the oil boom of the 1940s in the Permian Basin. Benedum died in 1959 and is interred at Homewood Cemetery.

References

1869 births
1959 deaths
American businesspeople in the oil industry
Wildcatters
Businesspeople from Pittsburgh
Pennsylvania Republicans
Pennsylvania Democrats
People from Bridgeport, West Virginia
Businesspeople from West Virginia
Burials at Homewood Cemetery